Tom Bean High School is a public high school located in Tom Bean, Texas (USA). It is part of the Tom Bean Independent School District located in southeast Grayson County and classified as a 2A school by the UIL. In 2015, the school was rated "Met Standard" by the Texas Education Agency.

Athletics
The Tom Bean Tomcats compete in these sports - 

Baseball
Basketball
Cross Country
Football
Golf
Powerlifting
Softball
Tennis
Track and Field
Volleyball

References

External links
 

Schools in Grayson County, Texas
Public high schools in Texas